Young Merlin is a video game released for the Super NES in 1994. The game follows a young Merlin as he enlists the help of the Lady of the Lake to help him defeat the evil Shadow King.

Reception 

The game was praised by N-Force Magazine who gave the game a review score of 92% and described it as the next Zelda. Electronic Gaming Monthly commented that the game "strikes a good middle ground between fast action and slow RPGs. The levels are huge, the control is good and the graphics are up to the Virgin par." They gave the game a 7.6 out of 10. GamePro similarly praised the controls and graphics but remarked that the gameplay lacks challenge and involves too much walking back and forth. They summarized the game as "a magical, whimsical ride that proves to be more funny than it is challenging" and "a fun and entertaining sidebar to more serious RPGs."

References

External links 

 Young Merlin MobyGames

1994 video games
Works based on Merlin
Super Nintendo Entertainment System games
Super Nintendo Entertainment System-only games
Video games based on Arthurian legend
Video games developed in the United States
Video games scored by Frank Klepacki
Virgin Interactive games
Westwood Studios games
Single-player video games